Coplestone Bampfylde may refer to:

Sir Coplestone Bampfylde, 2nd Baronet ( 1633–1692), English MP for Tiverton and for Devon 1671–1679 and 1685–1689
Sir Coplestone Bampfylde, 3rd Baronet (c. 1689–1787), his grandson, British MP for Exeter and Devon 1713–1727
Coplestone Warre Bampfylde (1720–1791), British painter and landscaper